Take Me to the Kaptin is a song by the Canadian rock band Prism, written by Jim Vallance. It was the fourth single from the band's self-titled studio album Prism. “Take Me to the Kaptin” reached No. 52 on the Canadian singles chart and no. 59 on the Billboard Hot 100 singles chart in the United States. In 1978 "Take Me to the Kaptin" received the Certificate of Honour, from Performing Rights Organization of Canada (PROCAN)".

Versions
The U.S. single version (3:01) on Ariola Records has the verses switched. The Canadian single version (3:04) on GRT has the verses in the same order as the album version, and has a slightly longer fade out. Both single mixes also feature more synthesizer and guitar riffs.

Personnel
Prism
 Lindsay Mitchell - Guitar
 Ron Tabak - Vocals
 John Hall - Keyboards
 Jim Vallance - Drums
 Tom Lavin - Guitar

Session Musicians
 Richard Christie - Bass

Although Ab Bryant is considered the bassist and is pictured on the American cover, he did not take part in the recording.

Chart performance

References

 
 

1977 songs
1977 singles
Songs written by Jim Vallance
Prism (band) songs
Songs about spaceflight